Stefano Li Side (3 October 1926 – 8 June 2019) was a Chinese clandestine Roman Catholic bishop.

Li was born in China and was ordained to the priesthood in 1955. He served as clandestinely bishop of the Roman Catholic Diocese of Tianjin, China, from 8 August 1982 until his death in 2019.

Notes

1926 births
2019 deaths
21st-century Roman Catholic bishops in China
20th-century Roman Catholic bishops in China